Abdul Razak Hussein formed the second Razak cabinet after being invited by Tuanku Abdul Halim Muadzam Shah to begin a new government following the 24 August 1974 general election in Malaysia. Prior to the election, Razak led (as Prime Minister) the first Razak cabinet, a coalition government that consisted of members of the component parties of Barisan Nasional. It was the 6th cabinet of Malaysia formed since independence.

This is a list of the members of the second cabinet of the second Prime Minister of Malaysia, Abdul Razak Hussein.

Composition

Full members
The federal cabinet consisted of the following ministers:

Deputy ministers

Composition before cabinet dissolution

Full members

Deputy ministers

See also
 Members of the Dewan Rakyat, 4th Malaysian Parliament
 List of parliamentary secretaries of Malaysia#Second Razak cabinet

References

Cabinet of Malaysia
1974 establishments in Malaysia
1976 disestablishments in Malaysia
Cabinets established in 1974
Cabinets disestablished in 1976